Ciego de Ávila, nicknamed Búfalos, is a Cuban professional basketball team located in Ciego de Ávila.

The team has been competing in the Cuban Liga Superior de Baloncesto (LSB) since 2004 and has won a record 10 championships.

Honours 
Liga Superior de Baloncesto

 Champions (10): 2004–05, 2005–06, 2006–07, 2007–08, 2008–09, 2011–12, 2012–13, 2013, 2016, 2022

Notable players

 Yoel Cubilla
 William Granda
 Joan Luis Haiti
 Yaser Rodriguez

References

External links
Presentation at Latinbasket.com

Videos
 Baloncesto Cuba: Búfalos de Ciego de Ávila vs Toros de Artemisa - Youtube.com video

Basketball teams in Cuba
Basketball teams established in 2004
Ciego de Ávila